Saurita hilda is a moth in the subfamily Arctiinae. It was described by Herbert Druce in 1906. It is found in Peru.

References

Moths described in 1906
Saurita